Pierre de la Broce or de la Brosse (died 30 June 1278) was a royal favorite and councilor during the early reign of Philip III of France.

De la Broce was from a family of petty nobility in Touraine, and was a minor household official for Louis IX. After Louis' death in 1270, de la Broce quickly became a favorite of the new king. He accumulated a substantial fortune, built from Philip's largesse and from gifts from those hoping to cultivate his influence with the king.

This influence was greatly resented by many of the nobility and by associates of the Queen. In 1277 letters allegedly written by de la Broce were presented to Philip, which caused the king to have de la Broce arrested. He was finally hanged six months later. No trial was held, and the evidence was apparently suppressed, so the contents of the letters are unknown. Evidence has been put forward that de la Broce was framed.

Divine Comedy
De la Broce appears in Dante's Purgatory, in Canto VI, with the other spirits of those who, though redeemed, were prevented from making a final confession and reconciliation due to having died by violence:

I saw the soul
cleft from its body out of spite and envy—
not, so it said, because it had been guilty—
I mean Pier de la Brosse,
and may the Lady of Brabant [the Queen of France]
while she's still in this world, watch
her ways—or end among a sadder flock
from Allen Mandelbaum's translation

Further reading
Hélary, Xavier (2006). "Pierre de La Broce, seigneur féodal, et le service militaire sous Philippe III: L'ost de Sauveterre (1276)." Journal des savants (2): 275–305.

1278 deaths
13th-century French people
People executed by France by hanging
Executed French people
People executed by the Ancien Régime in France
Year of birth unknown
Executed people from Centre-Val de Loire
13th-century executions